Bianco is an Italian surname meaning "white". Notable people with the surname include:

 Adriana Bianco (born 1941), known professionally as Adrianita, Argentine actress
 Alessandro Bianco
 Andrea Bianco, Italian sailor and cartographer of the 15th century
 Bartolommeo Bianco (1604–1656), Italian architect and painter
 Caroline Blanco (pastor) (1949–2010), French pastor
 Chris Bianco, American celebrity chef
 Enzo Bianco (born 1951), Italian politician
 Esmé Bianco (born 1982), British actress, model, and performer
 Eugene "Bianco" Bianco (1927–2007), American harpist
 Gino Bianco (1916–1984), Italian racing driver
 Lory Bianco (born 1963), American singer
 Lucio Bianco (born 1941), Italian engineer
 Lucien Bianco (born 1930), French historian
 Margery Williams Bianco (1881–1944), English-American author
 Mike Bianco (born 1967), American baseball coach
 Nicholas Bianco (1932–1994), New York mobster
 Raffaele Bianco (born 1987), Italian footballer
 Umberto Zanotti Bianco (1889–1963), Italian archaeologist and politician

See also
 Eleonora Lo Bianco (born 1979), Italian volleyball player
 Tony Lo Bianco (born 1936), American actor

References

Italian-language surnames